Lionel Francis (born 14 June 1964) is a Antigua and Barbuda boxer. He competed in the men's bantamweight event at the 1988 Summer Olympics. At the 1988 Summer Olympics, he lost to Ndaba Dube of Zimbabwe. Francis also represented Antigua and Barbuda at the 1987 Pan American Games.

References

External links
 

1964 births
Living people
Antigua and Barbuda male boxers
Olympic boxers of Antigua and Barbuda
Boxers at the 1988 Summer Olympics
Pan American Games competitors for Antigua and Barbuda
Boxers at the 1987 Pan American Games
Place of birth missing (living people)
Bantamweight boxers